Initiative 182 was a 2016 ballot initiative that amended Montana law to legalize marijuana for medical use in the state.  The initiative passed via public referendum on November 8, 2016 with 58% of voters supporting and 42% opposing.

The text of the ballot measure states:

Results

See also
Cannabis in Montana

References

Initiatives in the United States
2016 cannabis law reform
Initiative 182
Montana Initiative 182
Montana ballot measures